Robert P. Braddicks (1882–1965) was a leading African-American businessman in New York City in the first half of the 20th century.

Biography
Robert Phillip Braddicks was born on November 8, 1882 in New York City.

In 1930, Braddicks became a vice president of Dunbar National Bank in Harlem. The financial institution was founded and principally owned by John D. Rockefeller Jr. and was located within the Paul Laurence Dunbar Apartments at 2824 Eighth Avenue at 150th Street. At the time, it was the only bank in Harlem operated by African Americans. It was also one of the few banks at the time that would hire African Americans as tellers, clerks and bookkeepers.

In August 1965, he died in his home in New York City after a brief illness.

References

1882 births
1965 deaths
American bankers
Businesspeople from New York City
20th-century American businesspeople